El Ghanayem ( Diminganim) is a town in Egypt. It is located near the city of Abu Tig in the Asyut Governorate.

See also

 List of cities and towns in Egypt

External links
El-Ghanayem

Populated places in Asyut Governorate